In phonology and phonetics, raising is a sound change in which a vowel or consonant becomes higher or raised, meaning that the tongue becomes more elevated or positioned closer to the roof of the mouth than before. The opposite effect is known as lowering. Raising or lowering may be triggered by a nearby sound, when it is a form of assimilation, or it may occur on its own.

The change occurred in all cases and was not triggered by a nearby front consonant or vowel. Later, Ancient Greek  was raised to become Koine Greek  and then . For more information, see 

That is a form of palatalization, and it also occurred in Polish in which it became a simple sibilant fricative  (spelled  or ) around the 16th century. The pronunciation  in Polish is considered to be nonstandard and is used only by some older speakers.

In Scottish Gaelic raising, compared with modern Irish for example  are raised to Scottish Gaelic  meaning, respectively, 'foot' (or 'leg') and 'word'.

Vowel shifts